= Blood group B linear chain alpha-1,3-galactosidase =

Class of enzymes

Identifiers
- EC no.: 3.2.1.n2

Databases
- BRENDA: enzyme data
- ExPASy: NiceZyme view
- KEGG: enzyme entry
- MetaCyc: metabolic pathway
- Rhea: reactions
- PDB structures: RCSB PDB PDBe PDBsum
Search
- PMC: articles
- PubMed: articles
- NCBI: proteins

Blood group B linear chain alpha-1,3-galactosidase (EC 3.2.1.n2) is an enzyme that catalyses the following chemical reaction:

Hydrolysis of terminal, non-reducing linear (1->3)-alpha-D-galactosidic residues, producing free D-galactose

== See also ==
- Blood group B branched chain alpha-1,3-galactosidase
